Aeschynanthus pulcher, the lipstick plant or red bugle vine, is a species of evergreen perennial plant in the family Gesneriaceae, native to Indochina and western Malesia. An epiphytic climber, it produces clusters of red flowers from summer to winter. The common name "lipstick plant" refers to the bright red tubular flowers, about 6 cm long, that emerge from a maroon calyx, which resemble lipstick emerging from a tube. The plant may grow 60 cm to 2 meters tall, with an average spread of 50 cm. The leaves are elliptic and are arranged in pairs, with smooth edges.

The specific epithet pulcher means "pretty" or "beautiful", referring to the brilliant red blooms.

It is particularly suitable for hanging baskets. It requires bright light but not direct sunlight, does best in humid conditions, and should be potted in a porous, acidic medium. It has gained the Royal Horticultural Society's Award of Garden Merit. It has heavy, succulent-like leaves and the soil should be allowed to dry out between waterings. Common pests include aphids and mealybugs.

Gallery

References

pulcher
Flora of Indo-China
Flora of Malesia